

The Caspar U 2 was a recce floatplane built for Japan in the 1920s. 

Two copies were constructed, and the aircraft formed the basis of the Yokosuka Navy Yokosho 1-go Reconnaissance Seaplane.

Specifications

References

Bibliography

1920s German military reconnaissance aircraft
U02
Biplanes
Single-engined tractor aircraft